Mihara Mitsuhiro (三原光尋; born 1964 in Kyoto, Japan) is a Japanese film director.

Filmography
真夏のビタミン (Manatsu no bitamin; lit. "Midsummer vitamin") (1994)
風の王国 (kaze no oukoku; lit. "Kingdom of the wind") (1995)
燃えよピンポン (Legend of Blood, Sweat & Tears) (1999)
絵里に首ったけ (Amen, Somen and Rugger Men!) (2000)
あしたはきっと・・・ (Ashita wa kitto...) (2001)
ドッジGoGo! (Dojji GoGo!) (2002)
Village Photobook (2004)
スキトモ (Sukitomo) (2007)
しあわせのかおり (Flavor of Happiness) (2008)
A Life with My Alzheimer's Husband (2023)

References

External links

JMDb profile (in Japanese)

1964 births
Living people
Japanese film directors
Crystal Simorgh recipients